Civionics is the combination of civil engineering with electronics engineering, in a manner similar to avionics (aviation and electronics) and mechatronics (mechanical engineering and electronics). An emerging discipline, the main application area of civionics is currently the use of electronics for structural health monitoring (SHM) of civil structures, particularly photonics (Fiber Optic Bragg Grating).

In SHM, Civionics will provide engineers with feedback necessary to aid in optimizing design techniques and understanding infrastructure performance, behaviour and state of condition. The successful integration of intelligent sensing of innovative structures will allow civil structural engineers to expand the design envelope by taking risks to introduce new design concepts, materials and innovation in civil engineering.

Civionic engineering applications include integrating science and technology from both new and traditional disciplines, including civil, structural, and electronics engineering; structural health monitoring, deformation monitoring, data acquisition, signal processing, metrology, telemetry, remote sensing, and other applications.

See also
Automatic Deformation Monitoring System
Wireless sensor network
Embedded system
Fiber Bragg grating
Accelerometer
Transducer
Tensometer

References

External links 
 SHM Glossary: Civionics
  ISIS Civionics Manual
 ISHMII - International Society for Structural Health Monitoring of Intelligent Infrastructure
 Chad Klowak, Getting Bridges to Talk
 Graz University of Technology, Civionics Course
 NCE Annual Report 2005-2006
 Research in the School of Engineering, University of Western Sydney - Civionics Research Node
 Micron Optics: Sensing News & Events
https://web.archive.org/web/20081011151259/http://www.specialtyphotonics.com/pdf/knowledge_base/sensor%20brochure%2005.pdf Furukawa Electric: Sensor Fibers]

Engineering disciplines
Civil engineering
Structural engineering